Mnin-Błagodać , also known as Błagodać, is a settlement in the administrative district of Gmina Słupia Konecka, within Końskie County, Świętokrzyskie Voivodeship, in south-central Poland.

References

Villages in Końskie County